Articles related to psychometrics (measuring intelligence and cognitive traits) include:
 Intelligence quotient
 Myers-Briggs Type Indicator
 Personality tests
 Scholastic Aptitude Test

Psychology lists
Indexes of science articles